Archeon is an archeological open air and living museum in Alphen aan den Rijn, Netherlands that opened in 1994. In Alphen an ancient Roman military fortress has been established around 40, the settlement was given the Latin name Albaniana.

Description
The museum features various historical periods of Dutch history via archeological reconstructions and Historical reenactments. Educated actors called archeo-interpreters inform visitors about the living circumstances at those days. Visitors can engage in activities. Among the periods portrayed are the Stone Age, the Roman times and the Medieval period. A restoration yard with original wooden ships from the Roman period, found at Zwammerdam, is part of the collection. The museum also contains an arena, where reenactments of Roman gladiator fights are held.

Archeon was and is host to several festivals such as the Midsummer Fair, the Midwinter Fair, the Roman Festival and the Elf Fantasy Fair .

Collection selection

See also
 Netherlands Open Air Museum at Arnhem
 Zuiderzee Museum at Enkhuizen
 Zaanse Schans at Zaandam

References

External links

Open-air museums in the Netherlands
Museums in South Holland
Living museums
1994 establishments in the Netherlands
Alphen aan den Rijn
20th-century architecture in the Netherlands